Hannes Kirchler (born 22 December 1978 in Merano) is an Italian discus thrower.

Biography
He is an eleven-time national champion in the discus throw, and a member of C.S. Carabinieri, an Italian military police sporting club. In 2007, Kirchler achieved his personal best throw of 65.01 metres at the Italian national championships in Bolzano.

Kirchler competed at the 2008 Summer Olympics in Beijing, and qualified for the men's discus throw.

His biggest achievement was to reach the Final at the 2016 European Athletics Championships in Amsterdam, Netherlands, where he threw 63.74m in the Qualifying and 60.18m in the Final.
He finished tenth.

Progression

Achievements

National titles
Hannes Kirchler has won 13 times for the individual national championships.
10 wins in discus throw (2005, 2006, 2007, 2008, 2009, 2010, 2014, 2015, 2016, 2017)
3 win in discus throw (2007, 2014, 2017) at the Italian Winter Throwing Championships

See also
 Italian all-time lists – Discus throw

References

External links
 
NBC 2008 Olympics profile
Profile – CS Carabinieri 

Athletics competitors of Centro Sportivo Carabinieri
Italian male discus throwers
Living people
Olympic athletes of Italy
Athletes (track and field) at the 2008 Summer Olympics
Sportspeople from Merano
1978 births
World Athletics Championships athletes for Italy
Athletes (track and field) at the 2018 Mediterranean Games
Mediterranean Games bronze medalists for Italy
Mediterranean Games medalists in athletics
20th-century Italian people
21st-century Italian people